Michael Donovan Mitchell (born October 6, 1982) is an American actor, comedian, and writer best known as a member of The Birthday Boys sketch comedy group. He is also known for his role as Randy Monahan on the Netflix series Love, and Cowan in the Amazon Prime Video film The Tomorrow War. He currently co-hosts the podcast Doughboys (with comedian and writer Nick Wiger), which reviews and discusses chain restaurants.

Early life
Mitchell was raised in Quincy, Massachusetts. He briefly attended Thayer Academy before graduating from North Quincy High School. Mitchell attended Ithaca College, graduating in May 2005.

Career
Mitchell started as an improv and sketch comedian at the Upright Citizens Brigade Theater (UCB) in Los Angeles.

He went on to write and star in The Birthday Boys for IFC until the show was canceled after two seasons. During this time he also appeared regularly on NBC's Parks and Recreation and IFC's Comedy Bang! Bang! In 2014, Mitchell played a fictionalized version of himself in the short film The Badger's Promise, the directorial debut of friends Harris Wittels and Armen Weitzman.

He was the head writer of Hidden America with Jonah Ray on the Seeso streaming service and played the recurring role of Randy Monahan on the Netflix comedy series Love.

Mitchell played the role of "Cowan" in the 2021 movie The Tomorrow War.

The Birthday Boys
In 2007, at UCB, Mitchell formed the sketch comedy group The Birthday Boys with Jefferson Dutton, Dave Ferguson, Mike Hanford, Tim Kalpakis, Matt Kowalick, and Chris VanArtsdalen. With the exception of Kowalick, all members of The Birthday Boys graduated from Ithaca College.

Mitchell and The Birthday Boys performed regularly at UCB and the group uploaded original sketches to their YouTube page.

The Birthday Boys gained notoriety within the LA comedy scene, appearing on Comedy Bang! Bang! and called Adam McKay's "favorite sketch group." The group met Bob Odenkirk through a show that Odenkirk's wife, Naomi Yomtov, created at UCB. They began collaborating with Odenkirk and were picked up for a sketch show, The Birthday Boys, at IFC, with Odenkirk and Ben Stiller as executive producers.

Mitchell featured frequently in The Birthday Boys sketches. His notable characters include Woosh, Pretty Dad, and September Santa. The series ran for two seasons before being canceled in 2014.

Mitchell still performs sketch comedy with The Birthday Boys and other projects.

Doughboys
Mitchell created the comedy podcast Doughboys with comedy writer Nick Wiger in 2015. Doughboys was named "The One Food Podcast to Start With" by pop culture site Vulture. The co-hosts review chain restaurants with a weekly guest, including Nicole Byer, Haley Joel Osment, Sarah Silverman, and all of the Birthday Boys, among others. Mitchell's fans call him "The Spoonman", "Mitchy Two-Spoons", "Spoon", "The Artist Formerly Known as Spoon", "Night Spoon", "Dorito Kid" and "Mr. Slice" all nicknames he gave himself. His Co-Host, Nick Wiger invites listeners to submit roasts of Mitchell to be read at the beginning of each episode, which often involve pop culture references and puns based on food or physique.

As of early 2018, the podcast is no longer associated with Feral Audio and is now a member of the HeadGum network. Mitchell and Wiger use Patreon to bring exclusive paid Doughboys content to their subscribers beyond the weekly episodes. As of June 2019, the Doughboys Patreon is the 9th most popular podcast Patreon and the 25th most popular Patreon in general.

On the June 13, 2019 episode of Doughboys, Wiger and Jason Mantzoukas offered Mitchell $15,000 if he can get an original song on the Billboard Hot 100 within a year. In 2020, the offer was extended indefinitely.

Filmography

Film

Television

Music videos

References

External links

1982 births
Living people
Male actors from Massachusetts
American comedy musicians
American male television actors
American television writers
American male television writers
Ithaca College alumni
People from Quincy, Massachusetts
Upright Citizens Brigade Theater performers
Screenwriters from Massachusetts
21st-century American comedians
North Quincy High School alumni
21st-century American screenwriters
21st-century American male writers